The Central Field is located to the east of Khafre's causeway and extends to the pyramid town of Queen Khentkaus I. One of the main excavators of the central field is Selim Hassan. The central field is located at the site of some large stone quarries that provided the stones for the construction of the first two pyramids at Giza. Hence the tombs date to the later part of the Fourth Dynasty and later. The tombs from the 4th Dynasty include those of queens Persenet,  Khamerernebty II, Rekhetre, Khentkaus I and Bunefer, as well as several royal sons.

4th Dynasty tombs

The tombs form the 4th Dynasty include several royal wives, sons and daughters.

References

Giza pyramid complex
Archaeological sites in Egypt
Cemeteries in Egypt